"Papa Don't Leech" is the sixteenth episode of the nineteenth season of the American animated television series The Simpsons. It originally aired in the United States on April 13, 2008 on the Fox network. It features the return of Lurleen Lumpkin (voiced by special guest star Beverly D'Angelo) from the third season episode "Colonel Homer", after an absence of sixteen years (though she appeared in a few quick cameos on such episodes as "Marge vs. the Monorail" and "Team Homer"). The Dixie Chicks also appear as themselves. The episode was written by Reid Harrison and directed by Chris Clements.

Plot

Lisa tries to sell Girl Scout cookies to Mayor Quimby, but finds the entire town treasury empty. Quimby explains that the city spent their funds on a new slogan, "Springfield: Good", so the town holds a meeting in order to raise money. They try faking a natural disaster in order to get relief money from Federal Emergency Management Agency. It turns out that the officials are impostors and the town goes into more debt than it was before. Lisa then reveals Springfield has millions in uncollected taxes, making the town collect them from its most notorious tax evaders (save Mayor Quimby and Mr. Burns).

News reporter, Kent Brockman reveals that all tax evaders have been dealt with, all but Lurleen Lumpkin, a country music star whom Homer once managed, and who had previously fallen in love with Homer. Homer finds Lurleen hiding in his car, and learns that after leaving her, she became broke. After comforting her, Homer agrees to take her home. Marge remembers how Lurleen wrecked her and Homer's marriage, and demands that she leave. Angrily driving with Lurleen, Marge discovers that Lurleen is homeless and begins to pity her. Marge reluctantly allows her to stay with the family. As a thank you, Lurleen hosts a barbecue for the family. Lurleen is soon arrested by the police and taken to court. Judge Snyder is lenient with Lurleen, only requiring that she repay her debt to society. After the trial, Lurleen explains how she cannot pay off her taxes because all her money went to her ex-husbands, all of which resemble Homer.

She goes to work for Moe Szyslak at his bar, where Lenny and Carl both try to go on a date with her. She denies both of them. Lurleen becomes depressed, and is heard singing through the vent about her father, Royce. Marge realizes that Lurleen's father left her, and she had given up faith in all men. Marge decides to get Lurleen and her father back together. Scouring Springfield, she finally finds Lurleen's father, Royce, and reunites the two. She forgives him and writes a new song to celebrate their reunion: "Daddy's Back". The two appear to have a newfound happiness. However, Royce eventually leaves Lurleen again. Soon, The Dixie Chicks play on TV, Lurleen's father is in their music video, and one of the Dixie Chicks claims that he wrote the song. The song is plagiarized from the song Lurleen wrote for their reunion. She goes to the Simpson's basement to sulk. Homer, in his Colonel Homer attire and "Major Marge" come to her, and tell her to take control of her destiny. Lurleen tells the Dixie Chicks that her father stole her song, and they proceed to hit him with their instruments as payback. Lurleen becomes the new opening act for the Dixie Chicks and finds a new boyfriend (who also has a resemblance to Homer), and Marge and Lurleen embrace. Out of earshot, Marge warns Lurleen never to come near Homer again.

Cultural references

The episode's title is a take-off of singer Madonna's song, "Papa Don't Preach".

Lurleen is shown singing the song, "Bunk with Me Tonight" (from "Colonel Homer") with Kermit; another Muppet, Miss Piggy, appears and drop-kicks him.

The opening dream scene where Homer suffocates his father parodies The Sopranos episode "Kennedy and Heidi" where Tony suffocates Chris in a similar way. 

Bart is seen playing with Mr. Potato Head.
Marge's bodywash is Estée Lauder.

In the final scene, Marge silently threatens Lurleen that if she ever comes near Homer again, she will strangle her with her own hair extensions. This parodies a scene in the HBO series Rome, in which Atia of the Julii, a Roman aristocrat, whispers death threats to Queen Cleopatra after an awkward social dinner.

When everyone is singing the "Daddy's Back" song Lisa is reading Harry Potter.

Reception
The episode received mixed reviews by critics.

Richard Keller of TV Squad expressed dislike for the episode stating that he hopes the show will reconsider the next time they decide to give a solo opportunity to a supporting character many people don't remember.

Robert Canning of IGN said, "there were too few laugh-out-loud moments in this lackluster episode. Overall, it was nice to see Lurleen again, but she'd probably get more laughs in future cameos than in carrying an entire episode." He gave the episode a 6/10. The opening sequence where Homer murders Grampa in a dream was criticized, being called "the least funny thing I've ever seen on the show" by IGN, "very un-Homer-like" by TV Squad.

References

External links

 Papa Don't Leech at Internet Movie Database

The Simpsons (season 19) episodes
2008 American television episodes